Denekia is a genus of flowering plants in the family Asteraceae.

There is only one known species, Denekia capensis, native to southern and tropical Africa (South Africa, Lesotho, Eswatini, Namibia, Botswana, Zimbabwe, Mozambique, Angola, Malawi, Tanzania).

References

Astereae
Monotypic Asteraceae genera
Flora of Africa